The 1959 Paris–Tours was the 53rd edition of the Paris–Tours cycle race and was held on 11 October 1959. The race started in Paris and finished in Tours. The race was won by Rik Van Looy.

General classification

References

1959 in French sport
1959
1995 in road cycling
October 1959 sports events in Europe
1959 Super Prestige Pernod